Al-Qusayr District is a district of the Homs Governorate in central Syria. The administrative centre is the city of Al-Qusayr. At the 2004 census, the district had a population of 107,470.

Sub-districts
The district of Al-Qusayr is divided into two sub-districts or nawāḥī (population as of 2004):
Al-Qusayr Subdistrict (ناحية القصير): population 70,965.
Al-Hoz Subdistrict (ناحية الحوز): population 36,505. - formed in 2010

Localities of the sub-district
According to the Central Bureau of Statistics (CBS), the following villages along with the towns of al-Qusayr and Al-Hoz, make up the district of al-Qusayr: 

al-Qusayr	29818	/
al-Hoz		2239	/
Rablah		5328	/
al-Ghassaniyah	4509	/
al-Aqrabiyah (al-Buwaydah al-Gharbiyah) 4326	
al-Nizariyah	3813	/
Jusiyah al-Amar	3447	/
al-Buwaydah al-Sharqiyah		3196 /
al-Dabaa		3129	/
Shinshar		3118	/
Dahiyat al-Majd	3061	/
Zita al-Gharbiyah	2922	/
Arjoun		2465	/
an-Naim	2290	/
Zira'ah		2250	/
Daminah al-Sharqiyah	1893	/
Jubaniyah (Ramtout)	1857	/
Dibbin			1696	/
Kafr Mousa	1610	/
al-Qurniyah		1329	/
Mudan		        1230	/
Bluzah		        1159	/
Tell al-Nabi Mando (Qadesh) 1068	/()
al-Hawi (al-Haweek)	1050	/
Husseiniya	1018	/
Daminah al-Gharbiyah	1012	/
Samaqiat Gharbiyah	866	/
Samaqiat Sharqiyah	864	/
al-Souadiyah		861	/
Hawsh Murshed Samaan	802	/

al-Fadhliyah		798	/
al-Burhaniyah (al-Radwaniyah)	744	/
al-Saloumiyah	725	/
al-Shoumariyah	713	/
Diyabiyah		698	/
Ras al-Ain (Hasabiyah)	690	/
Saqirjah (Ain al-Tannour) 674	/
al-Sakher (Hit)	656	/
Abou Jouri		652	/
al-Masriyah		618	/
Hawsh al-Said Ali	541	/
al-Nahriyah		529	/
al-Hammam		526	/
al-Shiahat		520	/
Ain al-Safa (Akoum)	506	/
Kammam		        474	/
al-Hamra		431	/
Wadi al-Hourani	379	/
al-Muh		        377	/
Umm Haratain Atiq	345	/
al-Aatafiyah		317	/
al-Khaldiyah		270	/
al-Masitbah		258	/
al-Buwait		181	/
Dahiraj		156	/
Wadi Hanna		138	/
al-Andalus		106	/
Koukran (al-Sadiat)	102	/
al-Hamidiyah		64	/
al-Haidariyah		56	/

References

 
Districts of Homs Governorate